Barbara Helbig (born 14 June 1958 in Dortmund) is a German professional golfer. In 1983 she became the first German to win on the Ladies European Tour.

Career
Helbig turned professional in 1975 and joined the Ladies European Tour in 1981. She won the opening tournament of the 1983 season, the Ford Ladies Classic at Woburn Golf and Country Club in England, by 4 strokes over Marta Figueras-Dotti of Spain. With the victory she became the first German winner on the LET. She came close to securing a second victory at the 1985 Ladies German Open, held at Braunfels Castle Golf Club near Frankfurt, where she lost a playoff to Julie Brown of Scotland.

At the 1987 La Manga Club Ladies European Open Helbig made 10 birdies during a round, a Ladies European Tour record behind only Laura Davies' 11 birdies at the inaugural French Ladies Open the same year.

Helbig won the German National Golf Championship 4 times and was runner-up 5 times. She retired from tour in 1991 and served as coach for the German National Team 1991–1996.

Professional wins (1)

Ladies European Tour wins (1)

References

External links

German female golfers
Ladies European Tour golfers
Sportspeople from Dortmund
1958 births
Living people
20th-century German women